Woodstock College was a Jesuit seminary that existed from 1869 to 1974. It was the oldest Jesuit seminary in the United States. The school was located in Woodstock, Maryland, west of Baltimore, from its establishment until 1969, when it moved to New York City, where it operated in cooperation with the Union Theological Seminary and the Jewish Theological Seminary. The school closed in 1974. It was survived by the Woodstock Theological Center, an independent, nonprofit Catholic research institute located at Georgetown University in Washington, D.C.

History

Woodstock College was originally located along the Patapsco River in Woodstock, Maryland, west of Baltimore. It incorporated in 1867, and opened on September 22, 1869.

In the 1960s, the college began considering affiliating with an urban university.

The argument to move the school into a city and place it in affiliation with a broader network of institutions of higher learning received decisive support from the newest ideas of theological education and priestly formation emerging from the Second Vatican Council and the Jesuits' own Thirty-First General Congregation. In consequence, the college closed its original campus and moved to New York City, New York in 1969 where it operated in cooperation with the Union Theological Seminary and the Jewish Theological Seminary. Controversies over the merits of the move into the city, specific controversies arising over the life style of the Jesuits in training in New York, and a general desire of the order to consolidate its theology schools nationally led to the school's closure in 1974.

It was survived until 2013 by the Woodstock Theological Center, an independent, nonprofit Catholic research institute located at Georgetown University in Washington, D.C. The theological library retains its independence through an affiliation with the library at Georgetown University, where it is still housed.

Campus

The original campus buildings in Woodstock, Maryland are now used as a Job Corps Center, while the campus grounds are part of Patapsco Valley State Park.

Rectors and Presidents of Woodstock College

Notable people

See List of people associated with Woodstock College

See also
 List of Jesuit sites

References

Citations

Sources

External links
Woodstock Letters collection

 
Defunct private universities and colleges in Maryland
Defunct Catholic universities and colleges in the United States
Educational institutions established in 1869
Educational institutions disestablished in 1974
Catholic seminaries in the United States
1869 establishments in Maryland
1974 disestablishments in Maryland
Catholic universities and colleges in Maryland
Jesuit universities and colleges in the United States